The Refuge Assurance Company Ltd. was a life insurance and pensions company based in England. It was founded by James Proctor and George Robins in Dukinfield, Cheshire in 1858. The company was originally known by the unwieldy name of the Refuge Friend in Deed Life Assurance and Sick Fund Friendly Society.

From 1895 until 1987, its head office was the magnificent Grade II* listed, Refuge Assurance Building on Oxford Street in central Manchester, now used as the Kimpton Clocktower Hotel. In 1987, the company decided to move out of the city centre to new, purpose-built, offices in the grounds of Fulshaw Hall in Wilmslow, around 12 miles south of the old Refuge Building. In October 1996, the Refuge Assurance Company merged with United Friendly to form the United Assurance Group (UAG).

After disappointing performances following the merger, the United Assurance Group was first approached by Britannic Assurance in November 1999, and then by Royal London Mutual Insurance Society in February 2000. Following successful talks, Royal London took over UAG for £1.6 billion.

Notes

Defunct companies based in Manchester
Insurance companies of the United Kingdom
Financial services companies established in 1858
1858 establishments in England